Sir John Flasby Lawrance Whittingdale  (born 16 October 1959) is a British politician serving as Member of Parliament (MP) for Maldon (and its predecessors) since 1992. A member of the Conservative Party, Whittingdale served as the Minister of State for Media and Data at the Department for Digital, Culture, Media and Sport (DCMS) from 2020 to 2021, having previously served at the DCMS as Secretary of State for Culture, Media and Sport in the Cabinet from 2015 to 2016.

Whittingdale has been an MP since the 1992 general election, for a series of constituencies centred on the town of Maldon, Essex. He was Vice-Chairman of the 1922 Committee. He was a member of the Executive of Conservative Way Forward (2005–2010) and the Conservative Party Board (2006–2010).

Whittingdale served as Chairman of the Culture, Media and Sport Committee from 2005 to 2015. He was appointed Secretary of State for Culture, Media and Sport by Prime Minister David Cameron in May 2015. He was one of the six Cabinet ministers to come out in favour of Brexit during the 2016 EU referendum and was afterwards a supporter of the Eurosceptic campaign Leave Means Leave. He was dismissed by Prime Minister Theresa May in July 2016 during a cabinet reshuffle.

Early life and career
Whittingdale was born on 16 October 1959. He is the only son of John Whittingdale FRCS (1894–1974) and Margaret Esme Scott (1920–), née Napier, who had previously married firstly, in 1942 (div. 1946), Capt. Ephraim Stewart Cook Spence, of the Argyll and Sutherland Highlanders, and secondly, in 1946, her cousin, Major Alexander Napier (d. 1954), of the Indian Army.  Via his mother Whittingdale is in distant remainder to the lordship of Napier. Whittingdale was educated at Sandroyd School and Winchester College, followed by University College London (UCL) where he was Chairman of UCL Conservative Society. He graduated with a 2:2 in Economics in 1982.

From 1982 to 1984, Whittingdale was head of the political section of the Conservative Research Department. He then served as Special Adviser to three successive Secretaries of State for Trade and Industry, Norman Tebbit (1984–1985); Leon Brittan (1985–1986), and Paul Channon (1986–1987). He worked on international privatisation at NM Rothschild in 1987 and in January 1988, became Political Secretary to Prime Minister Margaret Thatcher. Upon her resignation Whittingdale was appointed Order of the British Empire and continued to serve as her Political Secretary until being elected to Parliament in 1992.

Parliamentary career
Whittingdale entered the House of Commons in 1992 as the MP for South Colchester and Maldon. He was appointed Parliamentary Private Secretary to Eric Forth, Minister of State for Education and Employment, but resigned, as is customary, after voting against the Government for an amendment that would have allowed media publishers with more than a 20% share of the national press market to buy an ITV company.

He was later Shadow Culture Secretary from 2004 until the reshuffle following the general election in 2005, at which he was returned as MP for Maldon and Chelmsford East. In 2005, he was appointed to the Executive of Conservative Way Forward, a Thatcherite pressure group within the [Conservative Party. He is a council member of The Freedom Association and of the European Foundation. In 2008, he was elected as a parliamentary member to the Board of the Conservative Party and Vice Chairman of the Conservative Parliamentary 1922 Committee. In 2011, he was Chairman of the Football Governance Inquiry. 

In 2012, he was Chairman of the Joint Parliamentary Committee on Privacy and Injunctions.  he was Vice Chair of the All Party Parliamentary Intellectual Property Group.

Whittingdale was among the 175 MPs who voted against the Same-sex Marriage Bill in 2013. In 2014, Whittingdale along with six other Conservative MPs voted against the Equal Pay (Transparency) Bill which would require all companies with more than 250 employees to declare the gap in pay between the average male and average female salaries.

He was in favour of Brexit during the 2016 EU membership referendum. Following the referendum, which resulted in a narrow majority in favour of Brexit, he was one of several Conservative MPs who signed a letter to PM Theresa May urging that the UK withdraw from both the European Single Market and the Customs Union. After the referendum, Whittingdale was a supporter of the Eurosceptic campaign Leave Means Leave.

Media Select Committee
On 14 July 2005 he became the chairman of the Culture, Media and Sport Select Committee. In this role he led the committee's 2009/2010 investigation into libel and privacy issues, including the News International phone hacking scandal after The Guardian first revealed the extent of the practice at the News of the World. He was alleged to have warned members of the committee to consider not compelling former News of the World editor Rebekah Brooks to testify due to the potential risk that their personal lives would be investigated in revenge, but has strongly denied the accusation.

In April 2011 he called for a public inquiry into phone hacking at the News of the World and to why a series of investigations by Scotland Yard failed to link any News International employees to phone hacking other than the News of the Worlds former royal editor, Clive Goodman. Whittingdale said: "There are some very big questions; what I find [most] worrying is the apparent unwillingness of the police, who had the evidence and chose to do nothing with it. That's something that needs to be looked into."

With just one out of three of News International's senior executives agreeing to appear before the committee session on 19 July, Whittingdale took the rarely used step of issuing a summons to compel the Murdochs to attend. Whittingdale said Select Committees had taken such steps against individuals in the past and they had complied and continued "I hope very much that the Murdochs will respond similarly." They both did, on 19 July, in what one paper described as the most important Select Committee hearing in parliamentary history.

For its successful work on the phone hacking scandal, Whittingdale accepted The Spectators 2011 "Inquisitor of the Year" award on behalf of the Culture, Media and Sport Select Committee.

Culture Secretary
Whittingdale was appointed Secretary of State for Culture, Media and Sport by Prime Minister David Cameron on 11 May 2015. He was sworn in to the Privy Council following his appointment.

In April 2016, Shadow Culture Secretary Maria Eagle called for Whittingdale to recuse himself from decisions regarding the outcome of the Leveson Inquiry into press ethics because the story about Whittingdale's former girlfriend being a sex worker exposed him to pressure from the press. A week later, it emerged that Whittingdale had accepted hospitality from the Lap Dancing Association in about 2008 at which time Whittingdale and two other MPs visited two clubs in one evening, while the industry's licensing was under investigation by the Culture, Media and Sport Select Committee. The hospitality was not declared in the Register of members' interests, or later when Whittingdale later spoke out in the Commons against new regulations introduced by the Labour Government.

On 14 July 2016, Whittingdale was dismissed from his position as Culture Secretary by the new prime minister, Theresa May.

In July 2016, shortly after his dismissal, The Guardian criticised Whittingdale over his decision to turn down a request from the Daily Mirror for the release of historic documents relating to Mark Thatcher's dealings with the government of Oman in the 1980s. Roy Greenslade wrote that few, "apart from the man himself and his friends", could disagree with the argument that the public had a  right to know.

Whittingdale returned to the DCMS in February 2020, but as a minister of state rather than secretary of state. He was the minister of state for media and data.

Personal life
Whittingdale married Ancilla Campbell Murfitt, a nurse and school governor, in 1990; the couple had two children before their divorce. Whittingdale's half-brother is Charles Napier, former treasurer of the defunct Paedophile Information Exchange, who was most recently convicted of child sexual abuse offences in November 2014.

On 12 April 2016, British media reported Whittingdale had been involved in a relationship with a female sex worker between August 2013 and February 2014. In a statement to the BBC's Newsnight programme, he said he had been unaware of his girlfriend's true occupation after meeting her through Match.com, and that he had ended the relationship after he had discovered it through reports that the story was being offered for publication to tabloids. On 13 April 2016, David Cameron's spokesman said, "John Whittingdale's view was that this was in the past, and had been dealt with."

Whittingdale is a member of the Church of England.

 Honours 
 :
  21 December 1990: Appointed Officer of the Order of the British Empire (OBE) in the 1990 Resignation Honours.
 14 May 2015: Appointed to the Privy Council of the United Kingdom, giving him the honorific prefix "The Right Honourable" for life.
 14 October 2022: Appointed a Knight Bachelor in the 2022 Special Honours.
 :
  2019': Third Class of the Order of Merit of Ukraine

References

External links

 Official website

|-

|-

|-

|-

|-

|-

|-

1959 births
Living people
Alumni of University College London
British Eurosceptics
British Secretaries of State
Conservative Party (UK) MPs for English constituencies
English Anglicans
English people of Scottish descent
Knights Bachelor
Members of Parliament for Maldon
Members of the Freedom Association
Members of the Privy Council of the United Kingdom
Officers of the Order of the British Empire
People educated at Sandroyd School
People educated at Winchester College
People from Sherborne
Politicians awarded knighthoods
Politics of Maldon District
Recipients of the Order of Merit (Ukraine), 3rd class
UK MPs 1992–1997
UK MPs 1997–2001
UK MPs 2001–2005
UK MPs 2005–2010
UK MPs 2010–2015
UK MPs 2015–2017
UK MPs 2017–2019
UK MPs 2019–present